Ash Street School may refer to a building in the United States:

Ash Street School (Worcester, Massachusetts), listed on the National Register of Historic Places
Ash Street School (Manchester, New Hampshire), NRHP-listed